Theodore Criley (1880 - October 5, 1930) was an American hotel manager and artist. He joined the art colony in Carmel-by-the-Sea, where he was a watercolorist, portrait painter, and wood engraver.

Life
Criley grew up in Kansas City, Missouri, and he attended the Chicago Fine Arts Institute. He began his career as the manager of the Coates House Hotel in Kansas City, Missouri and the Lexington Hotel in Chicago.

Criley moved to California in 1919, where he joined the art colony in Carmel-by-the-Sea. He became a watercolorist, portrait painter, and wood engraver.

Criley married Myrtle Brotherton. They had two sons, including architect Theodore Criley Jr., and a daughter. They resided in Carmel Highlands, California. Criley died of a heart attack on October 5, 1930, in Palo Alto, California. His work can be seen at the Mills College Art Museum in Oakland.

References

1880 births
1930 deaths
People from Kansas City, Missouri
School of the Art Institute of Chicago alumni
Painters from California
American male painters
American portrait painters
American watercolorists
American wood engravers
20th-century American painters
20th-century American male artists